William Kenneally (12 October 1925 − 26 August 2009) was an Irish Fianna Fáil politician. He first stood for election at the 1961 general election but was unsuccessful. He was elected to Dáil Éireann as a Fianna Fáil Teachta Dála (TD) for the Waterford constituency at the 1965 general election. 

He was re-elected at each subsequent election until he lost his seat at the February 1982 general election. He was elected to the 16th Seanad in 1982 on the Administrative Panel. He did not contest the 1983 Seanad election.

Kenneally was twice Mayor of Waterford city in the 1970s and 1980s. His father William Kenneally also served as a TD for Waterford from 1952 to 1961, and his son Brendan Kenneally is a former TD for Waterford.

He died in Waterford Regional Hospital on 26 August 2009.

See also
Families in the Oireachtas

References

1925 births
2009 deaths
Fianna Fáil TDs
Members of the 18th Dáil
Members of the 19th Dáil
Members of the 20th Dáil
Members of the 21st Dáil
Members of the 22nd Dáil
Members of the 16th Seanad
Politicians from County Waterford
Fianna Fáil senators